Pink Floyd – The Wall is a 1982 British musical drama film directed by Alan Parker, based on Pink Floyd's 1979 album The Wall. The screenplay was written by Pink Floyd vocalist and bassist Roger Waters. The Boomtown Rats vocalist Bob Geldof plays rock star Pink, who, driven to insanity by the pressures of stardom and traumatic events in his life, constructs a physical and emotional wall to protect himself.

Like its associated album, the film is highly metaphorical, and frequently utilizes both visual and auditory symbols throughout its runtime. It features little dialogue, instead being driven by the music from the album throughout. The songs used in the film have several differences from their album versions, and one of the songs included, "When the Tigers Broke Free", does not appear on the album. Despite its turbulent production, the film received generally positive reviews and has an established cult following amongst Pink Floyd fans, although its reception from the band themselves has been less favorable.

Plot 

Pink is a depressed rock star who appears motionless and expressionless while remembering his father. Decades prior, his father is killed defending the Anzio beachhead during World War II in Pink's infancy; Pink's paranoid mother raises him alone. A young Pink discovers relics from his father's military service and death. An animation depicts the war, showing that the death of the people was for nothing. Pink places a bullet on the track of an oncoming train within a tunnel, and the train that passes has children peering out of the windows wearing face masks.

At school, he is caught writing poems in class and is humiliated by the teacher, who reads a poem from Pink's book. However, it is revealed that the poor treatment of the students is because of the unhappiness of the teacher's marriage. Pink recalls an oppressive school system, imagining children falling into a meat grinder. He fantasises about the children rising in rebellion and burning down the school, throwing the teacher onto a bonfire. As an adult, Pink remembers his overprotective mother and his marriage. During a phone call, Pink realises that his wife is cheating on him. His traumatic experiences are represented as a "brick" in the wall he constructs around himself that divides him from society.

Pink returns to the hotel room with a groupie, only for him to destroy the room in a fit of violence, scaring her away. Depressed, he thinks about his wife and feels trapped in his room. He then remembers every "brick" of his wall. His wall is shown to be complete, and the film returns to the first scene.

Now inside his wall, Pink does not leave his hotel room and begins to lose his mind to metaphorical "worms". He shaves all his body hair and watches television. The young Pink searches through the trenches of the war, eventually finding himself as an adult. Young Pink runs in terror and appears at a railway station, with the people demanding that the soldiers return home. Returning to the present, Pink's manager finds him in his hotel room, drugged and unresponsive. A paramedic injects him to enable him to perform.

In this state, Pink thinks he is a dictator, and his concert is a fascist rally. His followers attack blacks, gays, and Jews. He then holds a rally in London. Marching hammers goose-step across ruins. Pink stops hallucinating and screams "stop", deciding he no longer wants to be in the wall. He cowers in a bathroom stall, quietly singing to himself as a security guard walks past him. Pink, as a rag doll, is on trial for "showing feelings of an almost human nature". His teacher and wife accuse him, while his mother tries to take him home. His sentence is "to be exposed before his peers," and the judge gives the order to "tear down the wall!". Following a prolonged silence, the wall is smashed and Pink screams. Children clean up a pile of debris and empty a Molotov cocktail.

Cast 

 Bob Geldof as Pink
 Kevin McKeon as Young Pink
 David Bingham as Little Pink
 Christine Hargreaves as Pink's mother
 Eleanor David as Pink's wife
 Alex McAvoy as Teacher
 Bob Hoskins as Rock manager
 Michael Ensign as Hotel manager
 James Laurenson as Pink's father
 Jenny Wright as American groupie
 Margery Mason as Teacher's wife
 Ellis Dale as English doctor
 James Hazeldine as Lover
 Ray Mort as Playground father
 Robert Bridges as American doctor
 Joanne Whalley, Nell Campbell, Emma Longfellow, and Lorna Barton as Groupies
 Philip Davis and Gary Olsen as Roadies

Production

Concept 
In the mid-1970s, as Pink Floyd gained mainstream fame, songwriter Roger Waters began feeling increasingly alienated from their audiences:Audiences at those vast concerts are there for an excitement which, I think, has to do with the love of success. When a band or a person becomes an idol, it can have to do with the success that that person manifests, not the quality of work he produces. You don't become a fanatic because somebody's work is good, you become a fanatic to be touched vicariously by their glamour and fame. Stars—film stars, rock 'n' roll stars—represent, in myth anyway, the life as we'd all like to live it. They seem at the very centre of life. And that's why audiences still spend large sums of money at concerts where they are a long, long way from the stage, where they are often very uncomfortable, and where the sound is often very bad.
Waters was also dismayed by the "executive approach", which was only about success, not even attempting to get acquainted with the actual persons of whom the band was composed (addressed in an earlier song from Wish You Were Here, "Have a Cigar"). The concept of the wall, along with the decision to name the lead character "Pink", partly grew out of that approach, combined with the issue of the growing alienation between the band and their fans. This symbolised a new era for rock bands, as Pink Floyd explored “the hard realities of 'being where we are'", echoing ideas of alienation described by existentialists such as Jean-Paul Sartre.

Development 

Even before the original Pink Floyd album was recorded, the intention was to make a film from it. The original plan was for the film to be live footage from the album's tour, together with Scarfe's animation and extra scenes, and for Waters himself to star. EMI did not intend to make the film, as they did not understand the concept.

Director Alan Parker, a Pink Floyd fan, asked EMI whether The Wall could be adapted to film. EMI suggested that Parker talk to Waters, who had asked Parker to direct the film. Parker instead suggested that he produce it and give the directing task to Gerald Scarfe and Michael Seresin, a cinematographer. Waters began work on the film's screenplay after studying scriptwriting books. He and Scarfe produced a special-edition book containing the screenplay and art to pitch the project to investors. While the book depicted Waters in the role of Pink, after screen tests, he was removed from the starring role and replaced with new wave musician and frontman of the Boomtown Rats, Bob Geldof. In Behind the Wall, both Waters and Geldof later admitted to a story during casting where Geldof and his manager took a taxi to an airport, and Geldof's manager pitched the role to the singer, who continued to reject the offer and express his contempt for the project throughout the fare, unaware that the taxi driver was Waters' brother, who told Waters about Geldof's opinion.

Since Waters was no longer in the starring role, it no longer made sense for the feature to include Pink Floyd footage, so the live film aspect was dropped. The footage culled from the five Wall concerts at Earl's Court from 13–17 June 1981 that were held specifically for filming was deemed unusable also for technical reasons as the fast Panavision lenses needed for the low light levels turned out to have insufficient resolution for the movie screen. Complex parts such as "Hey You" still had not been properly shot by the end of the live shows. Parker convinced Waters and Scarfe that the concert footage was too theatrical and that it would jar with the animation and stage live action. After the concert footage was dropped, Seresin left the project and Parker became sole director.

Filming 

Parker, Waters and Scarfe frequently clashed during production, and Parker described the filming as "one of the most miserable experiences of my creative life." Scarfe declared that he would drive to Pinewood Studios carrying a bottle of Jack Daniel's, because "I had to have a slug before I went in the morning, because I knew what was coming up, and I knew I had to fortify myself in some way." Waters said that filming was "a very unnerving and unpleasant experience".

During production, while filming the destruction of a hotel room, Geldof suffered a cut to his hand as he pulled away the Venetian blinds. The footage remains in the film. It was discovered while filming the pool scenes that Geldof did not know how to swim. Interiors were shot at Pinewood Studios, and it was suggested that they suspend Geldof in Christopher Reeve's clear cast used for the Superman flying sequences, but his frame was too small by comparison; it was then decided to make a smaller rig that was a more acceptable fit, and he lay on his back. In Nicholas Schaffner's book Saucerful of Secrets: The Pink Floyd Odyssey (1991) it is claimed that the body cast from the film Supergirl (1984) was actually used instead.

The war scenes were shot on Saunton Sands in North Devon, which was also featured on the cover of Pink Floyd's A Momentary Lapse of Reason six years later.

Release 
The film was shown out of competition during the 1982 Cannes Film Festival.

The film's official premiere was at the Empire, Leicester Square in London, on 14 July 1982. It was attended by Waters and fellow Pink Floyd members David Gilmour and Nick Mason, but not Richard Wright, who was no longer a member of the band. It was also attended by various celebrities including Geldof, Scarfe, Paula Yates, Pete Townshend, Sting, Roger Taylor, James Hunt, Lulu, and Andy Summers.

Box office and critical reception 

The Wall opened with a limited release on 6 August 1982 and entered at No. 28 of the US box office charts despite only playing in one theatre on its first weekend, grossing over $68,000, a rare feat even by today's standards. The film then spent just over a month below the top 20 while still in the top 30. The film later expanded to over 600 theatres on 10 September, achieving No. 3 at the box office charts, below E.T. the Extra-Terrestrial, and An Officer and a Gentleman. The film eventually earned $22 million before closing in early 1983.

The film received generally positive reviews. Review aggregator website Rotten Tomatoes gives the film the approval rating of 72% based on 29 critic reviews, with the average score of 7.3 out of 10. The critical consensus reads "Pink Floyd's expression of generational angst is given striking visual form The Wall, although this ambitious feature's narrative struggles to marry its provocative images and psychedelic soundtrack into a compelling whole."

On Metacritic, the film holds the weighted average score of 47 out of 100 based on 13 critic reviews, indicating "mixed or average reviews".

Reviewing The Wall on their television programme At the Movies in 1982, film critics Roger Ebert and Gene Siskel gave the film "two thumbs up". Ebert described The Wall as "a stunning vision of self-destruction" and "one of the most horrifying musicals of all time ... but the movie is effective. The music is strong and true, the images are like sledge hammers, and for once, the rock and roll hero isn't just a spoiled narcissist, but a real, suffering image of all the despair of this nuclear age. This is a real good movie." Siskel was more reserved in his judgement, stating that he felt that the film's imagery was too repetitive. However, he admitted that the "central image" of the fascist rally sequence "will stay with me for an awful long time." In February 2010, Ebert added The Wall to his Great Movies list, describing the film as "without question the best of all serious fiction films devoted to rock. Seeing it now in more timid times, it looks more daring than it did in 1982, when I saw it at Cannes ... It's disquieting and depressing and very good." It was chosen for the opening night of Ebertfest 2010.

Danny Peary wrote that the "picture is unrelentingly downbeat and at times repulsive ... but I don't find it unwatchable – which is more than I could say if Ken Russell had directed this. The cinematography by Peter Biziou is extremely impressive and a few of the individual scenes have undeniable power." It earned two British Academy Awards: Best Sound for James Guthrie, Eddy Joseph, Clive Winter, Graham Hartstone and Nicholas Le Messurier, and Best Original Song for Waters.

Waters said of the film: "I found it was so unremitting in its onslaught upon the senses, that it didn't give me, anyway, as an audience, a chance to get involved with it," although he had nothing but praise for Geldof's performance.

Gilmour stated (on the "In the Studio with Redbeard" episodes of The Wall, A Momentary Lapse of Reason and On an Island) that the conflict between him and Waters started with the making of the film. Gilmour also stated on the documentary Behind The Wall (which was aired on the BBC in the UK and VH1 in the US) that "the movie was the less successful telling of The Wall story as opposed to the album and concert versions."

Although the symbol of the crossed hammers used in the film was not related to any real group, it was adopted by white supremacist group the Hammerskins in the late 1980s.

Themes and analysis 
It has been suggested that the protagonist stands for Waters. Beyond the obvious parallel of them both being rock stars, Waters lost his father while he was an infant and had marital problems, divorcing several times. It has also been suggested that Pink represents former lead singer, writer and founding member Syd Barrett, both in his appearance (although Geldolf also bares a resemblance to Waters) as well as in several incidents and anecdotes related to Barrett's descent from pop stardom due to his struggles with mental illness and self-medicating with drugs. One seemingly blatant reference is Pink's detachment from the world as he locks himself away in his room before a show and shaves himself down while suffering a mental break. During a mental breakdown, Barrett shaved his head and face before showing up to a band rehearsal (after already having been removed from the band). Barrett also had shaved eyebrows when he visited the band during the Wish You Were Here recording. However, Bob Geldof, who plays Pink in the film, refused to shave his head for this part of the performance.

Another influence was the declining state of pianist Richard Wright, who was allegedly struggling with cocaine addiction at the time. This is referenced in the song Nobody Home: Got a grand piano to prop up my mortal remains.

Romero and Cabo place the Nazism and imperialism related symbols in the context of Margaret Thatcher's government and British foreign policy especially concerning the Falklands issue. The Thatcher involvement in the Falkland Islands would become the primary concept for their next album, The Final Cut. 

"There's a scene in the movie of The Wall where the guy smashes up a hotel room and tries to put it together," remarked Trent Reznor, explaining the theme of Nine Inch Nails' The Fragile. "As he tries, it's obviously not right, but he's trying to make semblance [sic] of things. That's a visual that I've used in my head. It's helped me."

Awards 
The Wall was nominated for and won two BAFTA Awards: Best Original Song (Roger Waters, for the song "Another Brick in the Wall") and Best Sound (James Guthrie, Eddy Joseph, Clive Winter, Graham V. Hartstone, Nicolas Le Messurier).

Documentary 
A documentary was produced about the making of Pink Floyd – The Wall entitled The Other Side of the Wall that includes interviews with Parker, Scarfe, and clips of Waters; it originally aired on MTV in 1982. A second documentary about the film was produced in 1999 entitled Retrospective: Looking Back at The Wall that includes interviews with Waters, Parker, Scarfe, and other members of the film's production team. Both are featured on The Wall DVD as extras.

Soundtrack 

The film soundtrack contains most songs from the album, albeit with several changes, as well as additional material (see table below).

The only songs from the album not used in the film are "Hey You" and "The Show Must Go On". "Hey You" was deleted as Waters and Parker felt the footage was too repetitive (eighty percent of the footage appears in montage sequences elsewhere) but a workprint version of the scene is included as a bonus feature on the DVD release.

A soundtrack album from Columbia Records was listed in the film's end credits, but only a single containing "When the Tigers Broke Free" and the rerecorded "Bring the Boys Back Home" were released. "When the Tigers Broke Free" later became a bonus track on the 1983 album The Final Cut. Guitarist David Gilmour dismissed the album as a collection of songs that had been rejected for The Wall project, but were being recycled. The song, in the edit used for the single, also appears on the 2001 compilation album Echoes: The Best of Pink Floyd.

In addition to the above, Vera Lynn's rendition of "The Little Boy That Santa Claus Forgot" was used as background music during the opening scenes.

 Chart positions

Certifications

References

External links 

 
 
 
 A Complete Analysis of Pink Floyd – The Wall by Bret Urick
 Original screenplay by Roger Waters

Pink Floyd films
The Wall (rock opera)
1982 films
1982 animated films
1980s musical drama films
1980s psychological drama films
British animated films
British drama films
British musical films
Adultery in films
Allegory
BAFTA winners (films)
Fiction with unreliable narrators
Films scored by Michael Kamen
Films about fascists
Films based on albums
Films directed by Alan Parker
Films set in the 1950s
Films set in the 1970s
Films with live action and animation
British nonlinear narrative films
Sung-through musical films
Visual albums
Rock operas
Films shot at Pinewood Studios
Goldcrest Films films
Metro-Goldwyn-Mayer films
Films about depression
1982 drama films
Pink Floyd video albums
1980s English-language films
1980s British films